Eugenio Claro (born September 23, 1993 in Santiago, Chile) is an alpine skier from Chile. Claro competed for Chile at the 2014 Winter Olympics in three alpine skiing events.

Background
Claro started alpine skiing during his teens in 2006. Claro said the ski season in Chile is short, lasting three months. Most of the ski resorts are in the Andes and difficult to access, which makes the sport expensive for Chileans.

World Cup results

Results per discipline

 standings through 20 Jan 2019

World Championship results

Olympic results

See also

 Alpine skiing at the 2014 Winter Olympics – Men's giant slalom
 Alpine skiing at the 2014 Winter Olympics – Men's slalom
 Alpine skiing at the 2014 Winter Olympics – Men's super-G

References 

1993 births
Living people
Chilean male alpine skiers
Olympic alpine skiers of Chile
Alpine skiers at the 2014 Winter Olympics
Sportspeople from Santiago
21st-century Chilean people